QE2 Hospital may refer to:

New QEII Hospital, in Hertfordshire 
Queen Elizabeth II Health Sciences Centre, in Halifax, Nova Scotia
Queen Elizabeth II Jubilee Hospital, in Brisbane, Australia